Neil John Dexter (born 21 August 1984) is a South African-born English cricketer.

Early life
Dexter was born in Johannesburg and attended Northwood School in Durban North and Downside School in Somerset in England. He went on to study at the University of South Africa.

Career
He is a right-handed batsman and a right-arm medium bowler. He made his debut for Kent against Nottinghamshire at Canterbury, hitting an unbeaten 79 in his first innings. He then dismissed David Hussey with the first ball in the Notts second innings, although it was declaration bowling to try to force a result, having had no luck in 10 1st innings overs.

Having played two games in the Championship and two games in the totesport League he was contracted for 2006 and found particular success in the Twenty20 Cup competition opening the batting with Darren Stevens.
He was loaned to Essex County Cricket Club for a month and made his debut against Middlesex County Cricket Club in the Twenty20 Cup on 12 June 2008. Dexter top scored with 47, as the team went down to a defeat. It was announced on 16 September 2008 that Dexter was to leave Kent at the end of the 2008 season to join Middlesex. He played for Middlesex in the Stanford Super Series. He captained Middlesex between 2010 and 2013.

On 7 September 2015 it was announced that Dexter had signed a three-year contract with Leicestershire which would run until the end of the 2018 season. He was released on 27 September 2019. He has signed to play white ball cricket for Suffolk C.C.C. for 2020.

References

External links

Neil Dexter at ECB

1984 births
Living people
English cricketers
Essex cricketers
Kent cricketers
Leicestershire cricketers
Middlesex cricketers
Middlesex cricket captains
Cricketers from Johannesburg
English cricketers of the 21st century